Grupo Lala is a Mexican dairy company, founded in 1949 in Torreón, Coahuila. The company is headquartered in Gómez Palacio, Durango. Together with its acquisition of Dairy Farmers of America subsidiary National Dairy (of which it owns 87.5%) is one of the largest dairy companies in the world.

History
The company was founded in 1949 in Torreón, Coahuila. It expanded into the United States in 2008, acquiring a manufacturing plant in Omaha, Nebraska, and in 2009, LALA acquired National Dairy, Farmland Dairies and Promised Land. The company's Chairman is Eduardo Tricio and the CEO is Arquimedes Celis Ordaz. LALA is now the largest dairy company in Latin America. The company name makes reference to its origin "La Laguna", a region located in Northern Mexico where the Mayran Lagoon is located.

Grupo Lala was listed 12th in Dairy Foods magazine's list of the top 100 North American dairies. It was the only dairy from Mexico to be listed in the top 100.

Grupo Lala purchased National Dairy from Dairy Farmers of America, Inc. (DFA), in 2009. Prior to its purchase by Grupo Lala, National Dairy encompassed numerous dairy brands including: Borden, Dairy Fresh, Velda Farms, Flav-O-Rich, Sinton's, Cream O’ Weber, Meyer Dairy, Dairymen's, Coburg Dairy, Goldenrod and Georgia Soft Serve Delights.

In 2009, Grupo Lala purchased National Dairy Holdings L.P. from the Dairy Farmers of America. In 2011, Grupo Lala spun off its American operations under the name Laguna Dairy (now Borden Milk Products). In 2016, Grupo Lala reacquired three plants from Laguna Dairy and reentered the US.

In August 2017, Grupo Lala agreed to acquire Brazilian dairy firm Vigor, and its stake in Itambé for BRL 5.725 billion (US$1.84 billion).

Grupo Lala was listed 39th in Food Processing magazine's list of the top 100 Food and Beverage companies for 2017, based on products produced in the U.S. and Canada only.

Marketing

Yogurting campaign

In early 2016, LALA U.S. launched its first nationwide advertising campaign to promote its drinkable yogurt smoothie products. The campaign uses the hashtag "#yogurting" in television and internet ads, as well as in social media.

The launch included the introduction of LALA Greek Yogurt Smoothies plus three new LALA Yogurt Smoothie flavors: cherry vanilla, pomegranate blueberry and vanilla almond cereal. That's in addition to the LALA Yogurt Smoothies 14 original flavors.

LALA Yogurt Smoothies are available at various retailers across the country including Walmart, Albertson's Safeway, Publix, HEB, ShopRite and others.
LALA has targeted a demographic called "Shapers On the Go" who value health and convenience. About 60% of the target audience is made up of millennials.

On Feb. 23, 2016, LALA Yogurt Smoothies were featured as the sponsor of a comedy sketch on Jimmy Kimmel Live, in which Jimmy's sidekick Guillermo Rodriguez is tricked into jumping over a pit of live snakes.

On March 4, 2016, LALA Yogurt Smoothies were the commercial sponsors of another well-received comedy skit, this time on Conan featuring Conan's prop Master Bill Tull.

LALA was also the featured sponsor for a game sketch called "View Your Tune" in March on ABC's The VIew. The segment was hosted by Paul Shaffer.

Brands
Lala
Yomi Lala
Peti Zoo
Bio4
Lalacult
Nutri Leche
Los Volcanes
Monarca
Mileche
Boreal
Break
Bio Balance
Siluette
Natural'es
Las Puentes
Borden
Bell (Lala has a minority stake)
Vigor

United States
Borden (Texas, Louisiana)
Coburg Dairy (South Carolina)
Cream O'Weber (Utah)
Dairy Fresh (Louisiana, Alabama, Mississippi)
Dairymens (Ohio)
Farmland (New Jersey)
Clinton 
Special Request
Welsh Farms
Flav-O-Rich (Kentucky)
Gilsa Dairy (Nebraska)
Frusion
La Creme
Goldenrod (Kentucky)
Meyer Dairy (Cincinnati)
Promised Land (Texas)
Sinton's (Colorado)
Velda Farms (Florida)

Factories
Tijuana
Torreón
Monterrey
Guadalajara
Mexico City
Irapuato
Mazatlán
Veracruz
Acapulco

References

External links
 Grupo Lala
 LALA U.S.

1950 establishments in Mexico
Food and drink companies established in 1950
Companies listed on the Mexican Stock Exchange
Dairy products companies of Mexico
Durango
Yogurt companies
Mexican brands